fdm (fetch/filter and deliver mail) is a mail delivery agent and email filtering software for Unix-like operating systems, similar to fetchmail and procmail.  It was started in 2006 by Nicholas Marriott who later also started tmux in 2007.

Adoption 
fdm is available as a package in many Unix-like operating systems.  It has been included in OpenBSD ports since 2007-01-18.

When in 2014 the last maintainer of procmail posted a message to an OpenBSD mailing list himself suggesting that he remove the procmail port, it has been suggested by a well-known OpenBSD ports maintainer that fdm is the natural alternative (the procmail port, however, has not been removed and remains in place as of 2020).

fdm is listed on the OpenBSD Innovations page, in the section of projects maintained by OpenBSD developers outside of OpenBSD.

See also 

 fetchmail
 procmail
 maildrop
 Sieve (mail filtering language)

References

External links 
 

Unix software
Free email software
Mail delivery agents
OpenBSD
Free software programmed in C
Software using the ISC license
Email clients